Ethyl vinyl ether is an organic compound with the chemical formula CH3CH2OCH=CH2. It is the simplest enol ether that is liquid at room temperature.  It is used as a synthetic building block and a monomer.

Preparation and reactions
Ethyl vinyl ether is made by reaction of acetylene and ethanol in presence of a base.

The alkene portion of the molecule is reactive in many ways. It is prone to polymerization, leading to formation of polyvinyl ethers. Polymerization is typically initiated with Lewis acids such as boron trifluoride. 

Ethyl vinyl ether participates in many reactions of interest to organic synthesis. With catalytic amounts of acids, ethyl vinyl ether adds to alcohols to give the mixed acetal:
EtOCH=CH2  +  ROH   →   EtOCH(OR)CH3
This alcohol protection reaction is akin to the behavior of dihydropyran.

Ethyl vinyl ether also participates in inverse demand [4+2] cycloaddition reactions.  

Deprotonation with butyl lithium gives the acetyl anion equivalent:
EtOCH=CH2  +  BuLi   →   EtOC(Li)=CH2  +  BuH

Toxicity
The toxicity of vinyl ethers has been heavily investigated because they have been used as inhalation anesthetics.  The acute LD50 for the closely related methyl vinyl ether is greater than 4 g/kg (rats, oral).

References 

Ethers
Vinyl compounds